This is a list of theatres and concert halls in Barcelona, Catalonia, Spain, and its surrounding metropolitan area.

Theatres and concert venues in Barcelona
L'Antic Teatre
Auditori AXA
Barcelona City Hall
Barcelona Teatre Musical
Biblioteca de Catalunya
Brossa Espai Escènic
Cafè-Teatre Llantiol
Círcol Maldà
Club Capitol
Club Helena
Coliseum
Espai Navae
El Liceu, Barcelona's opera house
El Molino, emblematic cabaret venue on the Paral·lel, reopened in October 2010.
Fundació Joan Miró
Guasch Teatre
Jove Teatre Regina
L'Auditori
La Farinera del Clot
La Puntual, specializing in puppet shows.
La Riereta Teatre
Mercat de les Flors
Sala Aurèlia Capmany
Sala Ovidi Montllor
Nau Ivanow
Palau de la Música Catalana
Palau Sant Jordi
Porta 4
Sala Atrium
Sala Beckett
Sala BeCool
Sala El Off
Sala Màgic
Sala Muntaner, theatre
Sala Raval
Sala Razzmatazz (former Zeleste)
Sant Andreu Teatre
Sidecar Factory Club
Tantarantana Teatre
Teatre Apolo
Teatre Aquitània
Teatre Artèria Paral·lel
Teatre Borràs
Teatre CCCB (Centre de Cultura Contemporània de Barcelona)
Teatre Centre de Gràcia
Teatre Condal
Teatre del Raval,  Sant Antoni Abat 12
Teatre Gaudí de Barcelona, musicals
Teatre Goya
Teatre Grec, an amphitheatre styled on the Ancient Greek theatres. On Montjuïc
Teatre Lliure, Montjuïc
Sala Fabià Puigserver
Espai Lliure
Teatre Nacional de Catalunya
Teatre Novedades
Teatre Poliorama
Teatre Principal (Barcelona)
Teatre Romea
Teatre Tivoli
Teatre Victòria
Teatreneu
Versus Teatre
Villarroel Teatre

Theatre festivals
Festival Grec de Barcelona

Former or closed theatres
Artenbrut
Teatre Arnau, emblematic theatre on the Paral·lel.
Teatre Belle Epoque
Teatre Malic, formerly the smallest venue in town, emblematic for long years.
Teatro Mayor

Institut del Teatre
Institut del Teatre
Sala Maria Plans
Teatre Alegria
Teatre Estudi
Teatre Laboratori
Teatre Ovidi Montllor

Theatres and concert venues in the metropolitan area of Barcelona
Atrium Viladecans, in Viladecans
Auditori de Cornellà, in Cornellà de Llobregat
Auditori Miquel Martí i Pol, in Sant Joan Despí
Estraperlo (Club del Ritme), in Badalona
Círcol Catòlic, in Badalona
Foment Cultural i Artístic, in Sant Joan Despí
Fundació La Roda, in Montcada i Reixac
Salamandra, in L'Hospitalet de Llobregat
Teatre Blas Infante, in Badalona
Teatre Joventut, in L'Hospitalet de Llobregat
Teatre Mercè Rodoreda, in Sant Joan Despí
Teatre Núria Espert, in Sant Andreu de la Barca
Teatre Principal, in Badalona
Teatre Sagarra, in Santa Coloma de Gramenet
Teatre Zorrilla, in Badalona

See also
Culture of Barcelona
Avinguda del Paral·lel
Àlex Ollé, an artistic director of La Fura dels Baus

References

External links
Teatral.net

Culture in Barcelona
 
 
Barcelona
Theatres and concert halls in Barcelona
Theatres
Theatres
Barcelona